Boamah is a surname of Akan origin meaning helper of nations. Notable people with the surname include:

Edward Omane Boamah, Ghanaian politician
Patrick Yaw Boamah (born 1974), Ghanaian politician

Ghanaian surnames